John Heitland Godby (9 January 1880 – 28 November 1928) was an Australian rules footballer who played with Melbourne and Essendon in the Victorian Football League (VFL).

Notes

External links 

1880 births
1928 deaths
Australian rules footballers from Victoria (Australia)
Melbourne Football Club players
Essendon Football Club players